Tim or Timothy Campbell may refer to:

 Tim Campbell (activist)  (1939–2015), a gay activist and newspaper publisher
 Tim Campbell (actor) (born 1975), Australian actor and singer
 Tim Campbell (businessman) (born 1979), winner of the first series of the British version of The Apprentice
 Timothy J. Campbell (1840–1904), New York politician

See also 
 Campbell (surname)